Petershausen is a district of Constance.  It is situated on the right bank of the Seerhein, opposite the city centre.  It was named after the Petershausen Abbey.

History 
 There was a Roman settlement at this point, which was abandoned in the third century. Later. the area came into the possession of the Reichenau Abbey. A new settlement emerged after bishop Gebhard of Constance founded the imperial abbey of Petershausen. The villages developed relatively independently, but came increasingly under the influence of the city of Constance and became a suburb of Constance around the year 1600.

The development of Petershausen still remained quiet at first.  The suburb lost an important engine for development when the monastery was secularized in 1802 and the monastic building subsequently began to decay.  The remaining usable building of the monastery were used as a military hospital and expanded in 1850 to barracks.  In 1863 Baden State Railway connected Constance to its network with a terminal station at Petershausen.  This led to an upswing of Constance and Petershausen in particular.  Growth of Constance to the south was limited by the Swiss border, so the increase in population primarily occurred around the former monastery at Petershausen.  Promenades and new residential areas were built east of the Star Quarter, along the shore of Lake Constance, and in the north, along the road to Wollmatingen.  In 1912, an elementary school was founded in Petershausen, today's Theodor-Heuss-Realschule.  A new church was planned in 1913, but was delayed by World War I and the subsequent inflation and was only dedicated 17 years later.

The Star Quarter was torn down in 1936 to make room for the expansion of the Old Rhine Bridge.  The entire neighbourhood was demolished to make room for a multi-lane road and a railway underpass in the direction of Staad.  Only the name of the traffic junction  ("star place") is a reminder of the former quarter.

Populated places on Lake Constance
Populated places on the Rhine
Konstanz (district)